Nowadaga Creek is a river in Herkimer County in the state of New York. The basin drains portions of the towns of Danube, Stark, and Little Falls, as well as a small portion of the town of Warren, in southern Herkimer County before converging with the Erie Canal in Indian Castle, New York. The drainage basin is approximately 49 percent forested. The creek has an average slope of 1.7 percent over its entire stream length of 10.0 miles. On a 1790 land patent map it is spelled "Inchanando Creek".

Geology 

Nowadaga Creek flows over a bedrock bed for much of its length and, therefore, is not subject to alluvial processes as seen in many similarly sized river basins. Despite its natural and relatively undeveloped setting, for much of its length the creek lacks a well- developed natural floodplain. In many areas along the creek, the bedrock channel is disintegrating, and pieces of stone that originate from the channel bed are conveyed downstream and deposited in lower velocity reaches of the channel, contributing to debris jams, avulsions, and flooding.

References 

Rivers of New York (state)
Rivers of Herkimer County, New York
Mohawk River